The 2016–17 season was Aberdeen's 103rd season in the top flight of Scottish football and the fourth in the Scottish Premiership. Aberdeen also competed in the League Cup and the Scottish Cup.

Aberdeen also competed in qualifying for the 2016–17 UEFA Europa League.

Summary

August
Aberdeen were knocked out of the Europa League by Maribor in the Third qualifying round.

They were then boosted when top-scorer from last season Adam Rooney signed a new contract, keeping him at the club until 2020.

September

October

November
Aberdeen reached the League Cup Final but lost 3–0 to Celtic.

December
After the Cup final loss, McInnes became under pressure after a poor run of results in December which included an abandoned match at home against Motherwell.

However, the Dons ended 2016 with 3 wins out of their last 3 matches in the year, keeping the same starting line-up in all 3 matches, easing pressure on McInnes.

January
Graeme Shinnie boosted the Dons signing on an extra year to his contract.

February
On 6 February, Niall McGinn was awarded SPFL January Goal of the Month for his goal against Dundee.

After 3 bids were rejected in the January transfer window by Cardiff City, on 7 February Jonny Hayes signed a new contract extension to keep him at the club until 2019.

On 14 February, Andrew Considine signed a new contract to also keep him at the club until 2019.

March
On 9 March, English League One side Milton Keynes Dons announced that Peter Pawlett had signed a pre-contract deal to join the club at the end of the 2016–17 season.

On 29 March, Jonny Hayes earned his first start for Ireland in a 1-0 friendly defeat to Iceland.

On 30 March, Greg Tansey signed a pre-contract 3-year deal to join the club from Inverness Caledonian Thistle at the end of the 2016–17 season.

April

On 7 April, manager Derek McInnes won SPFL March Manager of the Month after reaching the Scottish Cup Semi-final and beating Dundee 7-0.

On 15 April, Aberdeen secured Europa League football for next season with a hard-fought win over St Johnstone in Perth.

On 22 April, Aberdeen reached the Scottish Cup final for the first time in 17 years with victory over holders Hibernian.

May

On 2 May, Jonny Hayes was shortlisted for player of the year in the PFA Scotland awards.

On 4 May, Derek McInnes was shortlisted for manager of the year in the PFA Scotland awards.

On 5 May, Joe Lewis, Shay Logan, Kenny McLean and Jonny Hayes all made the PFA Scotland's Premiership team of the year.

On 7 May, Aberdeen all but secured the Runners-up spot in the Premiership with a 2-1 win against Heart of Midlothian at Tynecastle Stadium.

On 12 May, Dean Campbell was introduced as a substitute against Celtic, becoming the club's youngest-ever player (a record previously held by Jack Grimmer).

On 17 May, Aberdeen defeated Rangers 2-1 at Ibrox Stadium, their first victory at that stadium since 1991. The result also mathematically confirmed Aberdeen's second place in the final league table.

On 21 May, teenager Scott Wright scored his first senior hat-trick to end the league season with a 6-0 win against Partick Thistle at Firhill.

On 24 May, Derek McInnes announced that Graeme Shinnie would captain the Dons in the Scottish Cup Final, after it was announced that Ryan Jack was leaving the club.

On 27 May, the Dons lost the Scottish Cup Final to Celtic, their sixth, in total, defeat to them this season against what was "The Invincibles".

Results and fixtures

Pre-season and friendlies

Scottish Premiership

UEFA Europa League

Aberdeen qualified for the first preliminary round of the UEFA Europa League by finishing second in the 2015–16 Scottish Premiership.

Qualifying phase

Scottish League Cup

Scottish Cup

Squad statistics
Joe Lewis was the only player to have played every minute of this season.

Appearances

|-
|colspan="10"|Players who left the club during the 2016–17 season
|-

|-
|colspan="10"|Players who left the club on loan during the 2016–17 season
|-

|}

Goalscorers

Disciplinary record

Team statistics

League table

Transfers

Players in

Players out

Loans in

Loans out

See also
 List of Aberdeen F.C. seasons

Footnotes

References

2016-17
Scottish football clubs 2016–17 season
2016–17 UEFA Europa League participants seasons